Lansky is a 2021 American biographical crime drama about the famous gangster Meyer Lansky, written and directed by Eytan Rockaway. It stars Harvey Keitel, Sam Worthington, AnnaSophia Robb, Minka Kelly, David James Elliott, John Magaro.

It was released on June 25, 2021, by Vertical Entertainment.

Plot
When the aging Meyer Lansky is investigated one last time by the Feds, who suspect he has stashed away millions of dollars over half a century, the retired gangster spins a dizzying tale, revealing the untold truth about his life as the notorious boss of Murder, Inc. and the National Crime Syndicate.

Cast
 Harvey Keitel as Meyer Lansky
 John Magaro as Young Meyer Lansky
 Sam Worthington as David Stone
 AnnaSophia Robb as Anne Lansky
 Dodge Price as Young Buddy Lansky
 Beau Hart as Child Buddy Lansky
 Jackie Cruz as Dafne
 David Cade as Ben Siegel
 David James Elliott as Frank Rivers
 Alon Abutbul as Yoram Alroy
 Minka Kelly as Maureen
 Shane McRae as Lucky Luciano
 James Moses Black as R.J. Campbell
 Claudio Bellante as Joe Bonanno

Production
In May 2019, it was announced Harvey Keitel, Sam Worthington, Emory Cohen and Austin Stowell had joined the cast of the film, with Alexandra Daddario and Tony Danza in negotiations to join with Eytan Rockaway directing from a screenplay he wrote. In February 2020, it was announced AnnaSophia Robb, Jackie Cruz, John Magaro, David Cade, David James Elliott, Alon Abutbul and Minka Kelly had joined the cast of the film, with Cohen, Stowell, Daddario and Danza no longer attached.

Principal photography lasted 20 days in Alabama in February 2020.

Release
In May 2021, Vertical Entertainment acquired distribution rights to the film, and set it for a theatrical and on VOD release on June 25, 2021.

Reception 
 On Metacritic, the film has a weighted average score of 45 out of 100, based on seven critics, indicating "mixed or average reviews".

Joe Leydon from Variety wrote  "Keitel [...] infuses his performance here with more than enough lion-in-winter gravitas to dominate every moment he is on screen, and quite a few when he isn't." Richard Roeper from Chicago Sun Times said "Harvey Keitel takes a swing at portraying the 'Mob's Accountant' and Keitel is as reliable as he's always been - but while this is a well-filmed and well-acted story, much of the material has been covered in superior movies."

References

External links
 
 
 

2021 crime drama films
2021 films
American biographical films
American crime drama films
Cultural depictions of Bugsy Siegel
Cultural depictions of Lucky Luciano
Cultural depictions of Meyer Lansky
Films about the American Mafia
Films about Jewish-American organized crime
Films shot in Alabama
Vertical Entertainment films
2020s English-language films
2020s American films